Michelle R. Paige Paterson (born April 1, 1961 in Fairfield, California) was the First Lady of New York state. Then-wife of New York Governor David Paterson, she became the First Lady of New York on March 17, 2008, when her husband was sworn in as governor, following the resignation of Eliot Spitzer.  Paige Paterson was the first African American First Lady in New York's history.

Michelle Paige Paterson spent her early years in the Crown Heights neighborhood of Brooklyn in New York City before moving to Staten Island, another New York City borough where she was raised by her mother, a Postal Service manager. She attended Syracuse University and earned a graduate degree in health-care management from Milano The New School for Management and Urban Policy. She married David Paterson on November 21, 1992; he was her second husband. They have a son together, born February 1994, named Alex. Paige Paterson has a daughter, Ashley, from her first marriage, who was raised by Paterson.

Paige Paterson is director of the integrated-wellness program at the Health Insurance Plan of New York HMO, a program that assists individuals with chronic health problems to better manage their conditions by helping them to improve their life skills. She previously worked as a lobbyist for North General Hospital in Manhattan.

On March 18, 2008, Paige Paterson and her husband both admitted to having had affairs with other people. Making these admissions was a strategy she supported in order to start David Paterson's governorship with full disclosure and to avoid "stoking the rumor mill".

Further reading
Paterson, David "Black, Blind, & In Charge: A Story of Visionary Leadership and Overcoming Adversity." New York, New York, 2020

References

External links
Biography on New York state's website
New York Daily News profile of and interview with Paige Paterson, 15 March 2008

1961 births
Living people
African-American businesspeople
21st-century American businesspeople
American lobbyists
First ladies and gentlemen of New York (state)
People from Crown Heights, Brooklyn
People from Fairfield, California
People from Staten Island
Syracuse University alumni
The New School alumni
David Paterson
21st-century American businesswomen